This is a list of Danish football transfers for the 2020-21 winter transfer window. Only moves featuring at least one Danish Superliga club are listed.

The winter transfer window opened on 1 January 2021. The window closed at midnight on 1 February 2021.

Danish Superliga

AaB

In:

Out:

AGF

In:

Out:

Brøndby

In:

Out:

Copenhagen

In:

Out:

Horsens

In:

Out:

Lyngby

In:

Out:

Midtjylland

In:

Out:

Nordsjælland

In:

Out:

OB

In:

Out:

Randers

In:

Out:

SønderjyskE

In:

Out:

Vejle

In:

Out:

References

Denmark
Transfers
2020–21